The Orleans Senate District is one of 16 districts of the Vermont Senate. The current district plan is included in the redistricting and reapportionment plan developed by the Vermont General Assembly following the 2020 U.S. Census, which applies to legislatures elected in 2022, 2024, 2026, 2028, and 2030.

The Orleans district includes most of Orleans County, the Towns of Burke, Newark, Sheffield and Sutton from Caledonia County, and the Town of Montgomery from Franklin County.

As of the 2020 census, the state as a whole had a population of 643,077. As there are a total of 30 Senators, there were 21,436 residents per senator.

District Senators

As of 2023
Robert Starr, Democrat

Towns in the Orleans district

Caledonia County 
Burke
Newark
Sheffield
Sutton

Franklin County 
Montgomery

Orleans County
Albany
Barton
Brownington
Charleston
Coventry
Craftsbury
Glover
Greensboro
Irasburg
Jay
Lowell
Newport (town)
Troy
Westfield
Westmore

See also
Essex-Orleans Vermont Senate District
Vermont Senate districts, 2012–2022
Vermont Senate districts, 2022–2032

References

External links
Redistricting information from Vermont Legislature
Map of current Orleans County Senate district

Vermont Senate districts